Parkinson's Europe, formerly the European Parkinson's Disease Association (EPDA), is a non-political, non-religious, and non-profit making organisation concerned with the health and welfare of people living with Parkinson's disease (PD) and their families and carers.

Parkinson's Europe is the only European Parkinson’s disease umbrella organisation. Founded in June 1992, in Munich, with a membership of 9 European Parkinson's patient organisations, Parkinson's Europe currently has a membership of 27 organisations from across Europe.

Parkinson's Europe provides an important forum for partnership. By encouraging constructive dialogue between national Parkinson's disease organisations, international patient and neurological organisations, and the pharmaceutical industry.


Aims and objectives 

The Parkinson's Europe's vision is that people with Parkinson's and their families have access to the highest standards of treatment, support and care they need to live a full and comfortable life.

In order to make this vision a reality, Parkinson's Europe aims to become the leading voice for Parkinson’s in Europe – providing innovative leadership, information and resources to national Parkinson’s organisations, European policymakers, the treatment industry, healthcare professionals and the media. In achieving these aims, to raise the profile of Parkinson’s and enable people living with the disease to be treated effectively and equally throughout Europe.

By working with their members – who represent the needs of individual people with Parkinson’s and their families at a national level – the Parkinson's Europe aims to:
ensure equal and timely access to prompt diagnosis and good-quality Parkinson’s care across Europe by raising standards and reducing existing inequalities
support the development of national Parkinson’s organisations throughout Europe
increase public and political awareness of Parkinson’s as a priority health challenge 
help reduce stigma and remove discrimination against people with Parkinson’s

References

External links 
 

European medical and health organizations
Organizations established in 1992
Parkinson's disease
International organisations based in Belgium
Neurology organizations
Medical and health organisations based in Belgium